College Football Data Warehouse is an American college football statistics website that was established in 2000. The site compiled the yearly team records, game-by-game results, championships, and statistics of college football teams, conferences, and head coaches at the NCAA Division I FBS and Division I FCS levels, as well as those of some NCAA Division II, NCAA Division III, NAIA, NJCAA, and discontinued programs. The site listed  as its references annual editions of Spalding's Official Football Guide, Street and Smith's Football Yearbooks, NCAA, NAIA, and NJCAA record books and guides, and historical college football texts.

College Football Data Warehouse was administered by Tex Noel and David DeLassus. Noel (which is a pen name) of Bedford, Indiana, is the executive director of Intercollegiate Football Researchers Association, a college football historian, statistician, and author.

The website was shut down sometime after February 19, 2017, but in September 2017 it was relaunched, although complete only through the 2015 season. The site yet again shutdown in 2020.

College Football Data Warehouse recognized national champions (1869–2015)
College Football Data Warehouse (CFBDW) is an online resource and database that has collected and researched information on college football and national championship selections. It provides a comprehensive list of national championship selectors and has itself recognized selectors that it has deemed to be the most acceptable throughout history. These include the National Championship Foundation (1869–1882), the Helms Athletic Foundation (1883–1935), the College Football Researchers Association (1919–1935), the Associated Press Poll (1936–2015), and the Coaches Poll (1950–2015). From its research, it has compiled a list of Recognized National Championships for each season. Some years include recognition of multiple teams for a particular season. Some universities claim championships not recognized by CFBDW or do not claim championships that are recognized by CFBDW. The table of National championship claims by school or individual team articles and websites may include additional or alternative national championship claims.

Below is a list of all of the CFBDW recognized national championships from 1869 to 2015.

References

External links
 

American football websites
Internet properties established in 2000